DNA repair protein RAD51 homolog 2 is a protein that in humans is encoded by the RAD51L1 gene.

Function 

The protein encoded by this gene is a member of the RAD51 protein family. RAD51 family members are evolutionarily conserved proteins essential for DNA repair by homologous recombination. This protein has been shown to form a stable heterodimer with the family member RAD51C, which further interacts with the other family members, such as RAD51, XRCC2, and XRCC3. Overexpression of this gene was found to cause cell cycle G1 delay and cell apoptosis, which suggested a role of this protein in sensing DNA damage. At least three alternatively spliced transcript variants encoding distinct isoforms have been observed.

Interactions 

RAD51L1 has been shown to interact with RAD51C.

References

Further reading